Dogie may refer to:

 A calf, especially one that is motherless or undersized
 Dogie Butte, a geographic feature in rural South Dakota

See also
 "Git Along, Little Dogies", a traditional cowboy ballad
 Git Along Little Dogies, a 1937 Gene Autry film